Air marshal (Air Mshl or AM) is an air-officer rank which originated within the Royal Air Force. The rank is used by the air forces of many countries which have historical British influence, including many Commonwealth nations. The rank is usually equivalent to a vice admiral or a lieutenant general.

Air marshal is immediately senior to the rank of air vice-marshal and immediately subordinate to the rank of air chief marshal. Officers in the rank of air marshal typically hold very senior appointments such as commander-in-chief of an air force or a large air force formation. Officers in the ranks of air chief marshal and air vice-marshal are also referred to generically as air marshals. Occasionally, air force officers of marshal rank are considered to be air marshals.

Royal Air Force use and history

Origins 
Prior to the adoption of RAF-specific rank titles in 1919, it was suggested that the RAF might use the Royal Navy's officer ranks, with the word "air" inserted before the naval rank title. For example, the rank that later became air marshal would have been air vice-admiral. The Admiralty objected to any use of their rank titles, including this modified form, and so an alternative proposal was put forward: air-officer ranks would be based on the term "ardian", which was derived from a combination of the Gaelic words for "chief" and "bird", with the term "second ardian" or "wing ardian" being used specifically for the rank equivalent to a vice-admiral and lieutenant-general. However, air marshal was preferred and has been used since its adoption in August 1919. Sir Hugh Trenchard, the incumbent Chief of the Air Staff when the rank was introduced, became the first air marshal on 11 August 1919.

RAF insignia, command flag and star plate 

The rank insignia consists of two narrow light blue bands (each on a slightly wider black band) over a light blue band on a broad black band. This is worn on the lower sleeves of the dress uniform or on shoulders of the flying suit or working uniform.

The command flag for an air marshal is defined by the single broad red band running in the centre of the flag.

The vehicle star plate for an air marshal depicts three white stars (air marshal is equivalent to a three-star rank) on an air force blue background.

Australia 

The Australian Air Corps adopted the RAF rank system on 9 November 1920 and this usage was continued by its successor, the Royal Australian Air Force. However, the rank of air marshal was not used by the Australian Armed Forces until 1940 when Richard Williams, an RAAF officer, was promoted.

In Australia, there are four appointments available for air marshals: the Chief of Air Force and, at times when they are occupied by an air force officer, the Vice Chief of Defence Force, the Chief of Joint Operations, and the Chief of Capability Development Group.

Canada 
The Royal Canadian Air Force (RCAF) used the rank until the 1968 unification of the Canadian Forces, when army-type rank titles were adopted and an air marshal became a lieutenant-general. In official French Canadian usage, the rank title was maréchal de l'air. The Canadian Chief of the Air Staff ordinarily held the rank of air marshal. The following RCAF officers held the rank (dates in rank in parentheses):

 Billy Bishop (1938 to 1944), rank retained on retirement
 George Croil (c. 1940 to 1944), rank retained on retirement
 Lloyd Samuel Breadner (1941 to 1945), subsequently promoted to air chief marshal
 Gus Edwards (1942 to 1944), rank retained on retirement
 Albert Cuffe (1942 to 1944), rank retained on retirement
 Robert Leckie (1944 to 1947), rank retained on retirement
 George Owen Johnson (to 1947), rank retained on retirement
 Wilfred Curtis (c. 1947 to 1953), rank retained on retirement
 Roy Slemon (c. 1953 to 1964), rank retained on retirement
 Frank Robert Miller (1955 to 1961), subsequently promoted to air chief marshal
 Hugh Campbell (1957 to 1962), rank retained on retirement
 Clare Annis (1962 to 1966), rank retained on retirement
 Clarence Dunlap (1962 to 1968), rank retained on retirement
 William Ross MacBrien (1958 to 1968), rank retained on retirement
 Edwin Reyno (1966 to 1968), later regraded to lieutenant-general

India 

The rank of air marshal was the highest in the Indian Air Force (IAF), held by the Chief of the Air Staff (CAS), from 1947 to 1966. In 1966, the rank of CAS was upgraded to air chief marshal and ACM Arjan Singh became the first CAS to hold the four-star rank.

Namibia 
The Namibian Air Force adopted the RAF rank system in 2010 previously having been using army ranks and insignia. However the rank of air marshal was not used until 1 April 2020 when Martin Pinehas was promoted to that rank and appointed as Chief of the Namibian Defence Force.

New Zealand 
In New Zealand, the head of the air force holds the lower rank of air vice-marshal. However, when an air force officer holds the country's senior military appointment, Chief of the New Zealand Defence Force, he is granted the rank of air marshal. The current Chief of Defence Force is an RNZAF officer, Air Marshal Kevin Short.

Other officers to hold the air marshal rank in New Zealand are:

 Sir Richard Bolt, promoted 1976, retired 1980
 Sir Ewan Jamieson, promoted 1983
 David Crooks, promoted 1986
 Carey Adamson
 Sir Bruce Ferguson, promoted 2001

Pakistan

Other language variants

The rank would have been equivalent to a major general.

Gallery

See also 

 Air force officer rank insignia
 British and U.S. military ranks compared
 Comparative military ranks
 RAF officer ranks
 Ranks of the RAAF

References

External links 

Air Marshal – Merriam-Webster

Air force ranks
Air marshals
Military ranks of Australia
Former military ranks of Canada
Military ranks of the Commonwealth
Military ranks of the Royal Air Force
Military ranks of Bangladesh
Military ranks of Sri Lanka